Qian Chunqi (7 December 1921 – 3 February 2010) was a Chinese doctor and translator who won the Lu Xun Literary Prize (1996), a prestigious literary award in China.

He was most notable for being one of the main translators into Chinese of the works of the German writer Friedrich Nietzsche.

Biography
Qian was born in a wealthy family in Taizhou, Jiangsu on December 7, 1921, his father was a businessman.

Qian primarily studied at the Wanzhu School, then he attended Jiangsu Provincial Shanghai School. One year later, Shanghai was occupied by Japan, the school closed, Qian attended Jiangsu Provincial Yangzhou School.

Qian entered Anhui Medical University in 1940, majoring in Western medicine, where he graduated in 1946. After graduating he worked in Changzheng Hospital, at the same time, he learned German, Japanese, English, French and Russian by himself.

In 1966, the Cultural Revolution was launched by Mao Zedong, the Red Guards confiscated his translations, he suffered political persecution.

Qian returned to work after the Chinese Economic Reform.

In 1995, Qian was employed as a translator in Shanghai Research Institute of Culture and History.

On February 3, 2010, Qian died of illness at Xuhui District Central Hospital, in Shanghai, aged 89.

Works
 Thus Spoke Zarathustra
 Poetry of Nietzsche (Friedrich Nietzsche)
 Essays of Nietzsche (Friedrich Nietzsche)
 Goethe's Faust (Johann Wolfgang von Goethe)
 Poetry of Goethe (Johann Wolfgang von Goethe)
 Poetry of Heine (Heinrich Heine)

Awards
 Lu Xun Literary Prize (1996)
 Chinese Translation Association – Senior Translator (2001)

References

1921 births
2010 deaths
People from Taizhou, Jiangsu
People's Republic of China translators
German–Chinese translators
20th-century Chinese translators
21st-century Chinese translators
Translators of Johann Wolfgang von Goethe